

Players

Squad information

Transfers

Summer transfer window

In:

Out:

Winter transfer window

In:

Out:

Squad stats

Disciplinary record

Matches

Competitive

Eredivisie

KNVB Beker

References

External links
 ADO Den Haag official website

ADO Den Haag seasons
Ado Den Haag